The Evangelical Methodist Church in the Philippine Islands is a Methodist Christian denomination. Founded on 28 February 1909 by Bishop Nicolás Zamora, it is recognised in the Philippines as the first indigenous Evangelical Protestant denomination.

History

Behind the founding of the IEMELIF were Filipino nationalist and subsequent independence movements that blossomed in the late 19th century. Filipinos wanted full autonomy in all spheres including religion, as three centuries of Spanish rule were marked by the Catholic Church's near-absolute control over the colony's temporal and spiritual affairs.

When the United States of America colonised the islands in 1898, they introduced Protestantism, which they propagated together with early Filipino evangelists. The Insular Government, in contrast to the Spanish employment of the Catholic Church (by then disestablished as the state church), had a policy of religious tolerance. Although the Americans upheld this principle of religious freedom, Filipinos wanted a truly autonomous church consistent with their yearnings for political freedom.

A group of Filipino preachers in the Methodist Episcopal mission in Tondo put up "Ang Katotohanan” (The Truth), an organisation that carried on evangelistic work in the country.

Nicolás Zamora

Nicolás Zamora y Villegas was the first Filipino Protestant minister, well-known in Filipino and American evangelical circles. He was also the founder and pastor of what is now the Knox Memorial Church. His father, Don Paulino Zamora, had been exiled from the colony for possession of a Bible, while Don Paulino's uncle, Father Jacinto Zamora, was one of the Gomburza priests who had been executed in 1872 by the Spaniards for supposed participation in the Cavite Mutiny.

When approached by Ang Katotohanan, Zamora accepted the leadership against the advice and importuning of the Americans. After some preparation, the group established the Iglesia Evangelica Metodista en las Islas Filipinas on 28 February 1909. Their vision and motivation was faith in God's providence, and belief that the Filipino was capable of erecting a self-sustaining, autonomous, and self-propagating evangelical church.

After Zamora
The fledgling Church quickly grew in numbers, spreading rapidly in Manila and its surrounding provinces. Bishop Zamora suddenly died on 14 September 1914, and Alejandro H. Reyes succeeded him. Reyes' successor was Victoriano Mariano who, aside from continuing the evangelisation programme from 1921 to 1926, also focused on Christian education. He saw to it that the laity knew what Church membership was all about, earning him the moniker “Father of Religious Education.” Francisco Gregorio's administration from 1926 to 1939 aimed to consolidate and build upon the achievements of his predecessors with the view to fortifying Church organisation. Bishop Gregorio initiated the formulation of the IEMELIF's own Discipline, based upon the Methodist Episcopal Discipline, which the Church had been using with minor adaptations until then. The first Central Temple was also built during this time in Tondo, at the site of the present Cathedral; the Central Temple was destroyed by fire in 1941.

During the Second World War, the occupying Japanese authorities wanted all Protestant churches consolidated into what is now the United Church of Christ in the Philippines. Bishop Matias B. Valdez, the Church's General Superintendent from 1939 to 1947, together with Bishop Dionisio D. Alejandro of the Methodist Church, firmly stood against the plan, whereas other churches yielded.

Post-war
Bishop Eusebio Tech's administration (1947–1952) saw the democratisation of the Church. The Discipline was revised to create of the Supreme Consistory of Elders, a board that became the legislative body of the Church, whilst the General Superintendent became the head of the Episcopacy, an organ which was tasked with administration.

The brief term of Bishop Marcelino C. Gutierrez (1952–1953) saw important contributions in the organisation of the Ministerial and Lay Workers Institute as a permanent agency of the Church. The Institute, which in 1991 became the present IEMELIF Bible College, trains the ministers, deaconesses, and other lay workers of the Church. Bishop Lázaro G. Trinidad's leadership (1953–1972) saw rapid progress; it was during this time that the Cathedral was finally rebuilt. The Church also introduced the then-innovative central fund system, and formalised relationships with both local and foreign religious groups.

Bishop Gerónimo P. Maducdoc took over as General Superintendent from 1972 to 1980. His administration was marked by greater participation of the laity in Church administration, with the inclusion of two laymen in the Supreme Consistory, which until then had been composed of only ministers. Among its other achievements were the Pagasa Trust Fund, intended to finance the social security needs of the Church; The Church Building Construction fund, to help in emergency needs for church construction; the Manpower Development Program, to train both ministers and laymen in religious, financial and social fields; and the evangelisation program dubbed “Eighty by 1980”.

Bishop George F. Castro took over as the tenth General Superintendent in 1980. The thrust of his administration was to adapt the Church to the changing times, to improve Church administration, to enhance evangelistic efforts, and to improve the professional and economic situation of ministers and Church workers. The IEMELIF also became more outgoing, participating in both local and international meetings and fellowships.

Schism
In 1992, the IEMELIF began experiencing some issues within its episcopal offices, which led to the secession of some 105 local churches and ministers forming what is now known as the IEMELIF Reform Movement (IRM), led by Bishop Reynaldo C. Domingo. The IRM initially referred to the original body as "IEMELIF Admin", which signifies acknowledgement of administration by the latter. In 2009, the two factions celebrated the IEMELIF's centennial in separate locations. The IEMELIF Admin held a programme at the Araneta Coliseum in Quezon City, while the IRM held theirs at the Cuneta Astrodome in Pasay.

In late 2011, the IRM completed its schism from the IEMELIF and is now registered with the Securities and Exchange Commission as the I am Redeemer and Master Evangelical Church (IRMEC), leaving only one IEMELIF in the whole of the Philippines. IEMELIF maintains its membership to the National Council of Churches in the Philippines, while IRMEC joined the Philippine Council of Evangelical Churches.

Recent years
Bishop Nathanael P. Lázaro was elected as the eleventh General Superintendent in 2000. Imbued with administrative abilities, he caused significant changes in the organisation and administration of the Church to make it more "attuned to the Great Commandment of the Lord Jesus Christ as stated in the Gospels." His efforts led to the overall amendment of the IEMELIF Book of Discipline in 2007.

Government recognition

In October 1979 — in celebration of both the 80th anniversary of Methodism in the Philippines and the 70th founding anniversary of the IEMELIF — the Metro Manila Commission renamed Sande Street fronting the Church's cathedral to Nicolas Zamora Street, after the Church's founder.

During the 75th founding anniversary of the IEMELIF, President Ferdinand E. Marcos proclaimed "February 28, 1984, as a special historical church day for thanksgiving on the founding of the first indigenous evangelical church in the Philippines." On the same day, a historical marker was installed by the National Historical Commission of the Philippines in front of the cathedral.

Civic contributions
The Church does not confine itself to purely internal matters.  It also conducts public crusades and rallies, as well as house to house Bible studies.  It also involves itself in civic and community affairs, extends help to victims of natural calamities like typhoons, earthquakes, and fires.  It is also active in helping promote matters of public interest such as the movements against drug use and against air and water pollution.  Helping promote public awareness of civic duties like voting is among its concerns.

Governance
The church is led by a General Superintendent, who is responsible for the well-being of all churches within the jurisdiction of the IEMELIF. The current General Superintendent is Bishop Noel M. Abiog, who accepted the post in 2016.

IEMELIF Cathedral

The original cathedral of IEMELIF was built in 1928 and took 13 years to build. It was destroyed in a large fire that gutted Tondo, Manila on 3 May 1941 but was rebuilt at the same site and completed on 28 February 1959, which was also the Church's 50th anniversary.

Architect Benjamin T. Felix drew up the structural design of the new cathedral. The church is laid out in a traditional cruciform plan, facing northwest. The building is constructed of cement in Gothic style. Its façade is flanked by twin spires, and features a large, quadruple lancet window at its centre. The eastern and western flanks of the edifice have pointed arch stained glass windows, which cast a light-green hue all throughout the church's interior.

A large, newly constructed choir loft looms above and over the narthex and entrance to the nave, which has a high ceiling with decorative hanging lamps. The framing of the ceiling, as well as the altar reredos, are made from Narra (Pterocarpus indices), wood donated by Brother Edward Tan, an avid sympathizer of the Church. The pulpit, lectern, pews and transept balconies have richly-carved woodwork with the same theme.

Gallery

References

External links
Official website

Buildings and structures in Tondo, Manila
Churches in Manila
Christian denominations in Asia
Methodism in the Philippines
Evangelicalism in the Philippines
Methodist denominations established in the 20th century
Methodist denominations
Evangelical denominations in Asia